Kathmandu Hanuman Dhoka Palace (KHP) also known as Basantapur Durbar Square is an ancient palace in Kathmandu. There are numerous monuments in the square. Some of the monuments in this area are listed as world heritage sites of the UNESCO.

List of Monuments

|}

See also 
 List of Monuments in Kathmandu, Nepal
 List of Monuments in Nepal

References

External links

Hanuman Dhoka
Kathmandu-related lists
Kathmandu Durbar Square